Happy Hogan (born Wallace Louis Bray, formal baseball name Wallace Louis Hogan; 1877–1915) was an American minor league baseball catcher and manager in the early 20th century. He is a member of the Pacific Coast League Hall of Fame.

Hogan was born on October 13, 1877, in Santa Clara, California. He played at Santa Clara College and then the University of Southern California (USC), captaining the USC Trojans to a championship. He first played professionally in 1901 in the 1899–1902 iteration of the California League. His team, the Sacramento Solons, moved to the Pacific Coast League (PCL) as a founding member in 1903, and Hogan remained in the PCL for the rest of his career. He played through the 1914 season, serving as a player-manager 1909–1914.

Hogan changed his last name, at least for baseball purposes, from Bray to hide his participation in the then–somewhat–déclassé profession of baseball from his father. Although Hogan was a very poor hitter (his lifetime batting average is .180 and slugging average is .217), he was a good catcher, had a scrappy larger-than-life personality and was a well-known figure in the beginning days of the PCL, was the longest-serving player from the PCL's founding year (1903–1914), and managed the Vernon/Venice Tigers (1909–1915), dying in harness. He was selected to the league's hall of fame either in 1943 or at some unknown point between 1943 and 1958 (detailed records have not been kept).

After Hogan took over the manager's chair of the Vernon Tigers in 1909, newspapers sometimes called the team "Hogan's Tigers". As a manager, Hogan was an advocate of the controversial innovation of uniform numbers.

Hogan contracted pneumonia and died on May 17, 1915 in Los Angeles at age 37.

References

External links

Sacramento (minor league baseball) players
Vernon Tigers players
1877 births
1915 deaths
Sportspeople from Santa Clara, California
Deaths from pneumonia in California